Albemarle may refer to:

People
 Albemarle (given name)
 Duke of Albemarle, includes a list of the dukes
 Earl of Albemarle, includes a list of the earls

Places

United States
 Albemarle, North Carolina, a city
 Albemarle Sound, an estuary on the coast of North Carolina
 Albemarle County, North Carolina, abolished 1739
 Albemarle Settlements, the first permanent English settlements in what is now North Carolina
 Albemarle County, Virginia

Elsewhere
 Albemarle Township, now part of the town of South Bruce Peninsula, Ontario, Canada
 Isabela Island (Galápagos), Ecuador, the largest island of the Galápagos Islands, originally known as Albemarle
 Aumale, France, formerly Albemarle, a commune in Upper Normandy
 Albemarle Street, Mayfair, London

Military
 , five ships of the Royal Navy
 , three ships of the US Navy
 CSS Albemarle, a Confederate States Navy ram
 Armstrong Whitworth Albemarle, a World War II transport aircraft of the Royal Air Force
 Albemarle Barracks, a prisoner-of-war camp during the American Revolutionary War
 Albemarle Barracks, England, a British Army barracks in Northumberland

Schools
 College of The Albemarle, Elizabeth City, North Carolina, United States, a community college
 Albemarle High School (disambiguation)
 Albemarle Training School, a segregated school for African Americans in Albemarle County, Virginia

Other uses
 Albemarle Baptist Church, Scarborough, North Yorkshire, England
 Albemarle Club, a private club in London, now defunct
 Albemarle Corporation, an American chemical company
 Albemarle Gallery, an art gallery located in Mayfair, London
 Albemarle Hospital, Elizabeth City, North Carolina
 Albemarle Hotel, Manhattan, New York City, a former hotel
 Museum of the Albemarle, in Elizabeth City, North Carolina
 Albemarle (1776), a convict ship of the Third Fleet to Australia

See also
 Port Albemarle, Falkland Islands
 Albemarle Group, a geologic group in North Carolina